Kazungula Bridge is a road and rail bridge over the Zambezi River between the countries of Zambia and Botswana at the town of Kazungula. The bridge features a single-line railway track between two traffic lanes and walkways for pedestrians.

Before the bridge was opened for traffic in May 2021, direct traffic between the two countries was possible only by ferry. The bridge takes advantage of the short  border the two countries share at the river, and is curved to avoid the nearby borders of Zimbabwe and Namibia.

History 
In August 2007 the governments of Zambia and Botswana announced a deal to construct a bridge to replace the existing ferry.

Construction of the US$259.3 million project, which includes international border facilities in Zambia and Botswana officially began on 12 October 2014 and was completed on 10 May 2021 by the South Korean construction firm Daewoo E&C. Opening was delayed due to transport issues affected by the COVID-19 pandemic. Construction was financed by the Japan International Cooperation Agency and the African Development Bank. 

The proposed Mosetse–Kazungula–Livingstone Railway is expected to be constructed via the Kanzungula Bridge.

See also 
 List of crossings of the Zambezi River
 Kazungula Ferry

References 

International bridges
Bridges in Zambia
Bridges in Botswana
Botswana–Zambia border crossings
Bridges over the Zambezi River
Road-rail bridges
Bridges completed in 2021